Plumbane, PbH4, is a metal hydride and group 14 hydride composed of lead and hydrogen. Plumbane is not well characterized or well known, and it is thermodynamically unstable with respect to the loss of a hydrogen atom. Derivatives of plumbane include lead tetrafluoride, PbF4, and tetraethyllead, (CH3CH2)4Pb.

History
Plumbane has repeatedly been the subject of Dirac–Hartree–Fock relativistic calculation studies, which investigate the stabilities, geometries, and relative energies of hydrides of the formula MH4 or MH2.

Properties
Plumbane is an unstable colorless gas and is the heaviest group IV hydride. Furthermore, plumbane has a tetrahedral (Td) structure with an equilibrium distance between lead and hydrogen of 1.73 Å. By weight percent, the composition of plumbane is 1.91% hydrogen and 98.09% lead. In plumbane, the formal oxidation states of hydrogen and lead are +1 and -4, respectively, because the electronegativity of lead(IV) is higher than that of hydrogen. The stability of metal hydrides with the formula MH4 (M = C–Pb) decreases as the atomic number of M increases.

Preparation
Early studies of PbH4 revealed that the molecule is unstable as compared to its lighter congeners (silane, germane, and stannane). It cannot be made by methods used to synthesize GeH4 or SnH4.

In 1999, plumbane was synthesized from lead(II) nitrate, Pb(NO3)2, and sodium borohydride, NaBH4. A non-nascent mechanism for plumbane synthesis was reported in 2005.

In 2003, Wang and Andrews carefully studied the preparation of PbH4 by laser ablation and additionally identified the infrared (IR) bands.

Congeners
Congeners of plumbane include:
 Methane, CH4
 Silane, SiH4
 Germane, GeH4
 Stannane, SnH4

References

Metal hydrides
Lead compounds